Nakahungaqtuaryuit formerly the Breakwater Islands are an island group located in Coronation Gulf, south of Victoria Island, west of Kiillinnguyaq, in the Kitikmeot Region, Nunavut, Canada. Other island groups in the vicinity include the Chapman Islands, Cheere Islands, Cockburn Islands, Piercey Islands, Porden Islands, Stockport Islands, Triple Islands, and Ungiiviit.

References 

 Breakwater Islands at the Atlas of Canada

Islands of Coronation Gulf
Uninhabited islands of Kitikmeot Region